|}

This is a list of results for the Legislative Council at the 1989 South Australian state election.

Continuing members 

The following MLCs were not up for re-election this year.

Election results

See also
 Candidates of the 1989 South Australian state election
 Members of the South Australian Legislative Council, 1989–1993

References

1989
1989 elections in Australia
1980s in South Australia